Gangura is a commune in Ialoveni District, Moldova. It is composed of four villages: Alexandrovca, Gangura, Homuteanovca and Misovca.

References

Mayor Bobeica Marcel

Communes of Ialoveni District